The 133rd Regiment Illinois Volunteer Infantry was an infantry regiment that served in the Union Army during the American Civil War. It was among scores of regiments that were raised in the summer of 1864 as Hundred Days Men, an effort to augment existing manpower for an all-out push to end the war within 100 days.

Service
The 133rd Illinois Infantry was organized at Camp Butler, Illinois, and mustered into Federal service on May 31, 1864, for a one hundred day enlistment.  The 133rd guarded prisoners at the Rock Island Arsenal.

The regiment was mustered out of service on September 24, 1864 at Camp Butler.

Total strength and casualties
The regiment suffered 16 enlisted men who died of disease, for a total of 16 fatalities.

Commanders
Colonel Thaddeus Phillips –  mustered out with the regiment.
Second lieutenant, co. F, 133rd regt. Illinois vol. inf. Henry A. Sturges

See also
List of Illinois Civil War Units
Illinois in the American Civil War

Notes

References
The Civil War Archive

Units and formations of the Union Army from Illinois
1864 establishments in Illinois
Military units and formations established in 1864
Military units and formations disestablished in 1864
Department of the interior united states of america bureau of pensions no. 724,996 Hannah L. Sturges widow of Henry A. Sturges June 5th 1911